William Batty (13 July 1886 – after 1922) was an English footballer who scored 24 goals in 85 appearances in the Football League playing for Sheffield United, Bristol City, Swindon Town and Barnsley. He played as an inside forward. He also played in Lincoln City 1911–12 Central League title-winning side, and in the Southern League for Swindon Town, during which time he appeared four times for the Southern League representative eleven.

References

1886 births
Year of death missing
People from Killamarsh
Footballers from Derbyshire
Scottish footballers
Association football inside forwards
Sheffield United F.C. players
Bristol City F.C. players
Lincoln City F.C. players
Swindon Town F.C. players
Barnsley F.C. players
English Football League players
Southern Football League players
Place of death missing